Mark Baguley (born 21 May 1987) is a former professional Australian rules footballer who played for the Essendon Football Club in the Australian Football League (AFL). Baguley played local footy with Langwarrin before joining Frankston in 2009 as a 21-year-old. He played there for three seasons, coming second in their best and fairest in 2011. He was recruited as a mature-age rookie by Essendon with pick 47 in the 2012 rookie draft. In July 2012 he was elevated to the senior list. He debuted in round 16 against  at AAMI Stadium.

Statistics
Statistics are correct to the end of round 4 of the 2017 season

|- style="background-color: #EAEAEA"
| 2012 ||  || 46 || 7 || 0 || 0 || 71 || 42 || 113 || 28 || 15 || 0.0 || 0.0 || 10.1 || 6.0 || 16.1 || 4.0 || 2.1
|- class="sortbottom"
| 2013 ||  || 46 || 21 || 2 || 1 || 177 || 159 || 336 || 111 || 59 || 0.1 || 0.0 || 8.4 || 7.6 || 16.0 || 5.3 || 2.8
|- class="sortbottom"
|- style="background-color: #EAEAEA"
| 2014 ||  || 12 || 22 || 0 || 2 || 234 || 162 || 396 || 138 || 71 || 0.0 || 0.1 || 10.6 || 7.4 || 18.0 || 6.3 || 3.2
|- class="sortbottom"
| 2015 ||  || 12 || 22 || 0 || 0 || 212 || 171 || 383 || 135 || 84 || 0.0 || 0.0 || 9.6 || 7.8 || 17.4 || 6.1 || 3.8
|- style="background-color: #EAEAEA"
| 2016 ||  || 12 || 10 || 1 || 3 || 103 || 72 || 175 || 63 || 35 || 0.1 || 0.3 || 10.3 || 7.2 || 17.5 || 6.3 || 3.5
|- class="sortbottom"
| 2017 ||  || 12 || 4 || 0 || 0 || 38 || 18 || 56 || 26 || 13 || 0.0 || 0.0 || 9.5 || 4.5 || 14.0 || 6.5 || 3.3
|- class="sortbottom"
! colspan=3| Career
! 86
! 3
! 6
! 835
! 624
! 1459
! 501
! 277
! 0.0
! 0.1
! 9.7
! 7.3
! 17.0
! 5.8
! 3.2
|}

References

External links

 

1987 births
Living people
Essendon Football Club players
Australian rules footballers from Victoria (Australia)
Frankston Football Club players
Australian people of English descent
Bendigo Football Club players